The men's marathon was part of the Athletics at the 1964 Summer Olympics program in Tokyo. It was held on 21 October 1964. 79 athletes from 41 nations entered, with 68 starting and 58 finishing. The maximum number of athletes per nation had been set at 3 since the 1930 Olympic Congress. The event was won by Abebe Bikila of Ethiopia, the first man to successfully defend Olympic gold in the marathon (and, indeed, the first to win two medals of any color in Olympic marathons). Unlike in 1960, he wore shoes this time. Great Britain earned its first marathon medal since 1948 with Basil Heatley's silver; Japan took its first medal since 1936 with bronze by Kōkichi Tsuburaya.

Background

This was the 15th appearance of the event, which is one of 12 athletics events to have been held at every Summer Olympics. Returning runners from the 1960 marathon included defending champion Abebe Bikila of Ethiopia and ninth-place finisher Osvaldo Suárez of Argentina. Bikila was favored to repeat. Significant challengers were Toru Terasawa of Japan (who had taken the world record from Bikila at the 1963 Beppu-Ōita Marathon and held it until the 1963 Polytechnic Marathon), Leonard Edelen of the United States (who had held the world record from the 1963 Polytechnic to the 1964 Polytechnic), and Basil Heatley of Great Britain (the current world record, who had broken it at the 1964 Polytechnic).

Luxembourg, Nepal, Puerto Rico, Rhodesia, Northern Rhodesia, Tanzania, Thailand, and Vietnam each made their first appearance in Olympic marathons. The United States made its 15th appearance, the only nation to have competed in each Olympic marathon to that point.

Competition format and course

As all Olympic marathons, the competition was a single race. The marathon distance of 26 miles, 385 yards was run over an out-and-back course. The course was very flat and straight.

Records

These were the standing world and Olympic records prior to the 1964 Summer Olympics.

Abebe Bikila set a new world record at 2:12:11.2.

Schedule

All times are Japan Standard Time (UTC+9)

Results

Bikila broke the world's best time for the marathon by 1 minute 44 seconds set by runner-up Basil Heatley four months prior at the Polytechnic Marathon to defend his Olympic gold medal.

References

External links
 Official Report
  Marathon Info

Athletics at the 1964 Summer Olympics
Marathons at the Olympics
Men's marathons
Oly
Men's events at the 1964 Summer Olympics